The 2012 UEFA Women's Under-17 Championship qualification were two rounds of qualifying tournaments for the 2012 UEFA Women's Under-17 Championship, which was held in Switzerland.

With the debut of Bosnia and Herzegovina a new record of 42 participating nations was set. The 42 UEFA members with the exception of Germany and Netherlands, which received a bye, were divided into 10 groups of four teams, with each group being contested as a mini-tournament, hosted by one of the group's teams. After all matches were played, the 10 group winners and the four best runners-up advanced to the second round.

The draw was made on 16 November 2010. Matches were played from 29 September 2011 to 22 October 2011.

First round

Seeding
The seedings were assigned according to the Under-17 coefficient ranking. There were three pots, with the ten highest ranked teams in Pot A, the next ten in Pot B and the rest in Pot C.

Pot A
 France, Spain, Norway, Sweden, England, Republic of Ireland, Denmark, Switzerland, Czech Republic, Scotland
Pot B
 Finland, Hungary, Ukraine, Italy, Belgium, Poland, Russia, Wales, Iceland, Turkey
Pot C
 Serbia, Macedonia, Austria, Slovenia, Lithuania, Faroe Islands, Kazakhstan, Croatia, Belarus, Israel, Romania, Azerbaijan, Latvia, Greece, Estonia, Northern Ireland, Bulgaria, Moldova, Georgia, Bosnia and Herzegovina

The hosts of the eleven one-venue mini-tournament groups are indicated below in italics.

Tiebreakers
Tie-breakers between teams with the same number of points are:
 Higher number of points obtained in the matches played between the teams in question
 Superior goal difference resulting from the matches played between the teams in question
 Higher number of goals scored in the matches played between the teams in question
If now two teams still are tied, reapply tie-breakers 1–3, if this does not break the tie, go on.
 Superior goal difference in all group matches
 Higher number of goals scored in all group matches
 Drawing of lots

Group 1

Group 2

Group 3

Group 4

Group 5

Group 6

Group 7

Group 8

Group 9

Group 10

Ranking of Runners-up teams
To determine the four best runners-up from the first qualifying round, only the results against the winners and third-placed teams in each group were taken into account.

The following criteria are applied to determine the rankings:
higher number of points obtained in these matches
superior goal difference from these matches
higher number of goals scored in these matches
fair play conduct of the teams in all group matches in the first qualifying round
drawing of lots

Second round
The ten group winners and the four best runners-up joined Germany and the Netherlands in the second round. There were four groups of four teams each. The four group winners advanced to the final round. The draw was held on 15 November 2011. 
The second round was played from 19 March 2012 to 1 May 2012.

Hosts of each mini-tournament are marked in italics.

Group 1

Group 2

Group 3

Group 4

Goalscorers
11 goals

 Marija Banušić

9 goals

 Sabrina Ribeaud

8 goals

 Nicole Billa
 Sarah Dyrehauge Hansen

7 goals

 Léa Declercq
 Amalie Vevle Eikeland
 Sonia Fraile
 Aline Stöckli
 Audrey Wuichet

6 goals

 Sandie Toletti
 Ewa Pajor
 Alexandra Lunca
 Tijana Djordjević

5 goals

 Lotte Aertsen
 Kateřina Svitková
 Laura Blanchard
 Kadidiatou Diani
 Magdalena Szaj
 Carmen Pulver

4 goals

 Lola Wajnblum
 Katie Zelem
 Sara Däbritz
 Clare Shine
 Raffaella Barbieri
 Ine Marie Thoresen Wedaa
 Andrea Esteban
 Alba Pomares
 Carla Puiggrós
 Chantal Sac

3 goals

 Tatiana Krasnova
 Lucie Hloupá
 Emilie Brøndum-Jensen
 Laura Jakobsen
 Vera Saastamoinen
 Julia Säppi
 Pauline Cousin
 Johana Gearain
 Fanni Diószegi
 Arianna Montecucco
 Agata Sobkowicz
 Elmira Piskunova
 Marija Rupreht
 Fanny Andersson
 Ebru Topçu

2 goals

 Sophie Maierhofer
 Lucinda Michez
 Evdokiya Popadinova
 Tereza Krejčiříková
 Abbey-Leigh Stringer
 Paige Williams
 Melinda Koivula
 Natalia Kuikka
 Taru Lindgren
 Alexandra Atamaniuk
 Griedge Mbock Bathy
 Laura Leluschko
 Manjou Wilde
 Dóra Zeller
 Elín Metta Jensen
 Glódís Perla Viggósdóttir
 Gemma McGuinness
 Vivianne Miedema
 Therese Sessy Åsland
 Lisa Fjeldstad Naalsund
 Joanna Wróblewska
 Iulia Obreja
 Elina Samoylova
 Caroline Weir
 Jelena Čanković
 Kristina Pantelić
 Nika Lombar
 Núria Mendoza
 Linda Hallin
 Moa Hedell
 Lina Hurtig
 Sandra Törnros
 Barla Deplazes
 Francesca Calo
 Tetyana Kozyrenko

1 goal

 Jelena Gatea
 Valentina Schwarzlmüller
 Adriana Stockinger
 Melis Sarialtin
 Yuliya Duben
 Johanna Koenig
 Silke Leynen
 Laura Van De Voorde
 Elien Van Wynendaele
 Selma Kapetanović
 Selma Omerović
 Merima Semić
 Anđela Šešlija
 Melisa Zukić
 Monika Conjar
 Gabrijela Gaiser
 Anna Dlasková
 Eva Rychtarova
 Lucie Winterová
 Anna Fisker
 Mille Poulsen
 Rosella Ayane
 Olivia Fergusson
 Hollie Kelsh
 Marianna Jacobsen
 Hanna Lönnqvist
 Tiia Peltonen
 Marika Ritvanen
 Julia Tunturi
 Marion Romanelli
 Laurie Saulnier
 Ana Cheminava
 Jana Spengler
 Regina Kókany
 Noémi Vöfély
 Berglind Ros Agustsdóttir
 Lára Einarsdóttir
 Eva Lind Eliasdóttir
 Svava Rós Guðmundsdóttir
 Hanna Kristin Hannesdóttir
 Sandra Jessen
 Ingibjörg Sigurdardóttir
 Amber Barrett
 Michelle Farrell
 Katie McCabe
 Ann Monaghan
 Marian Awad
 Soffer Fleitman
 Aurora Galli
 Matilde Malatesta
 Renāte Fedotova
 Eli Jakovska
 Cristina Cerescu
 Victoria Gurdiși
 Anne Bosveld
 Chelly Drost
 Lauren Brennan
 Aoife Curran
 Moya Feehan
 Jessica Foy
 Sigrid Heien Hansen
 Synne Jensen
 Cecilie Kvamme
 Karina Sævik
 Andrine Tomter
 Dżesika Jaszek
 Nikola Kaletka
 Loredana Cosma
 Katalina Filler
 Alexandra Nica
 Anna Belomyttseva
 Elizabeth Arnott
 Lucy Graham
 Zoe Ness
 Carolina Richardson
 Adrijana Delić
 Aleksandra Lazarević
 Nevena Milivojević
 Lucija Kos
 Manja Rogan
 Judith Fernández
 Mapi León
 Ana López
 Maitane López
 Gabriela Morales
 Mónica Orteu
 Blanca Rubio Landart
 Andrea Sánchez Falcón
 Malin Andersson
 Irma Magnusson
 Amanda Skyltbäck
 Alessa Castignetti
 Noelle Maritz
 Kübra Aydın
 Hilal Başkol
 Eda Duran
 Kateryna Korsun
 Yana Malakhova
 Rachel Hignett

1 own goal

 Anett Vilipuu (against Belgium)
 Juna Guchmanidze (against Switzerland)
 Eleonora Piacezzi (against Republic of Ireland)
 Jūlija Ņikiforova (against Poland)
 Dominique Janssen (against Finland)
 Jessica Foy (against Israel)

References

External links
UEFA.com
Tournament Regulations

qualification
2011 in women's association football
2012
2012 in youth sport